Downtown Altoona Historic District is a national historic district located at Altoona, Blair County, Pennsylvania.  The district includes 240 contributing buildings in the central business district and surrounding residential areas of Altoona.  The buildings were primarily built after about 1860 and include residential, civic, social, and religious buildings.  Although it does not encompass the entire downtown, it is for the most part the most urban part of Altoona's downtown district (whose boundaries are not very neatly defined anyway). Notable buildings include the Cathedral of the Blessed Sacrament (1920s), First Methodist Episcopal Church, First Presbyterian Church, First Evangelical Lutheran Church (1896-1897), U.S. Post Office (1931-1933), Fraternal Order of Eagles Building (demolished), Altoona City Hall, Casanave Building (1890s), Hutchison Block, McCrory's Department Store (1937), and Aaron-Penn Furniture Building.  Located in the district are the separately listed Central Trust Company Buildings, Mishler Theatre, and Penn Alto Hotel.

It was added to the National Register of Historic Places in 1992, with a boundary increase in 2004.

References

External links

  
 
  
  
  
  

Historic districts on the National Register of Historic Places in Pennsylvania
Historic districts in Blair County, Pennsylvania
Altoona, Pennsylvania
National Register of Historic Places in Blair County, Pennsylvania